Elías Wessin y Wessin (July 22, 1924 – April 18, 2009) was a Dominican politician and Dominican Air Force general. Wessin led the military coup which ousted the government of Dominican President Juan Bosch in 1963, replacing it with a triumvirate. Wessin was also a key figure in the ensuing Dominican Civil War, which led to a United States military intervention into and occupation of the Dominican Republic in 1965.

Early life

Wessin was born in Bayaguana, Monte Plata Province, Dominican Republic, on July 22, 1924. His parents were immigrants from the coastal town of Dekwaneh in Lebanon. The family name in Lebanon as it is used today is spelt Wazen, a phonetic variant of the name in Lebanese Arabic.

Wessin's career in the Dominican Air Force began as a military pilot.

Career
Wessin's first intervention in Dominican politics as an air force officer began in 1961, following the assassination of President Rafael Trujillo, a dictator. Wessin, who commanded an infantry battalion at the time of Trujillo's assassination, helped Trujillo's wife and family to flee the country.

During the Revolution, Wessin refused to abandon his post because he did not want the rebels, whom he accused of being pro-communist, to take over the country. This was partly why the U.S tended towards the loyalist (Wessin's forces), and not towards Francisco Caamaño, who was acting in the behalf of Juan Bosch.

Wessin was allowed to return from exile in 1978 after the government issued a general amnesty. He reconciled with his former political rival, President Joaquín Balaguer, and actively campaigned for Balaguer during the 1986 presidential election. Due to his support for Balaguer, Wessin served as the country's interior minister and, later, as Secretary of the Armed Forces during Balaguer's administrations.

Wessin was featured on the cover of Time magazine on May 7, 1965.

Death
Elías Wessin y Wessin died of a heart attack on April 18, 2009, in Santo Dominigo, Dominican Republic, at the age of 84. He was survived by his wife, Livia Chávez, and their two sons.

References

1924 births
2009 deaths
People from Monte Plata Province
Dominican Republic people of Lebanese descent
Dominican Republic military personnel
Dominican Republic politicians
History of the Dominican Republic
Candidates for President of the Dominican Republic